Slant was a science fiction fanzine edited by Walt Willis in collaboration with James White. It was in circulation between 1948 and 1953.

Slant won the retro-Hugo for Best Fanzine of 1954, awarded in 2004.

References

Hugo Award-winning works
Speculative fiction magazines published in Ireland
Magazines established in 1948
Magazines disestablished in 1953
Science fiction fanzines